Ferdinand Bušelić (born 25 January 1998) is a Croatian water polo player. He is currently playing for VK Solaris. He is 6 ft 5 in (1.95 m) tall and weighs 198 lb (90 kg).

References

1998 births
Living people
Croatian male water polo players